Thomas Bleakley (16 May 1893–1951) was an English footballer who played in the Football League for Hull City.

References

1893 births
1951 deaths
English footballers
Association football midfielders
English Football League players
Bolton Wanderers F.C. players
Hull City A.F.C. players
Goole Town F.C. players
Bridlington Town A.F.C. players
Wombwell F.C. players